This is a list of current and former destinations of Afriqiyah Airways from Libya.

List
Afriqiyah Airways operates to the following airports as of April 2019:

References

Lists of airline destinations
destinations
Libya transport-related lists